Shurok-e Tupkanlu (also Romanized as Shūrok-e Tūpkānlū and Shūrak-e Tūpkānlū) is a village in Shirin Darreh Rural District, in the Central District of Quchan County, Razavi Khorasan Province, Iran. At the 2006 census, its population was 478, in 120 families.

References 

Populated places in Quchan County